Marcus Valerius Messalla Niger was a senator of the Roman Republic.

Career
He was praetor in the year of Cicero's consulship, 63 BC, and consul in 61 BC, the year in which Publius Clodius profaned the mysteries of the Bona Dea, and Gnaeus Pompeius triumphed for his several victories over the Cilician pirates, Tigranes the Great and Mithridates VI of Pontus. Messalla, as consul, took an active part in the prosecution of Clodius. Messalla was censor in 55 BC.

As an orator, Messalla was thought to be respectable.  In 80 BC he was engaged in collecting evidence for the defence in the cause of Sextus Roscius of Ameria. In 62 BC he solicited Cicero to undertake the defence of his kinsman, Publius Cornelius Sulla. In 54 BC he was one of the six orators whom Marcus Aemilius Scaurus retained on his trial.

He was interrex three times, in 55, 53 and 52 BC.

Marriage and children

Messalla married a woman named Polla, by whom he had a son, Marcus Valerius Messalla Corvinus and two daughters, both named Valeria, who married Quintus Pedius and Servius Sulpicius Rufus, the son of the consul of 51 BC (also named Servius Sulpicius Rufus), respectively.

Footnotes

References
Asconius Pedianus, in Scaurian. p. 20, Orelli
Caesar, Bellum Gallicum, i.2.
Cicero, ad Atticum, i.12, 13, 14; ad Familiares, viii.2, 4; Brutus, 70; pro Sextio Roscio, 51; pro Sulla, 6.
Dio Cassius, Roman History, xxxvii.46;
Pliny the Elder, Naturalis Historis, vii.26, viii.54, xxxviii.2.
 Syme, Ronald, Augustan Aristocracy

Roman patricians
1st-century BC Roman consuls
Roman Republican praetors
Roman censors
Senators of the Roman Republic
Niger, Marcus